Fasharud Rural District is in the Central District of Birjand County, South Khorasan province, Iran. At the National Census of 2006, its population was 2,727 in 871 households. There were 2,124 inhabitants in 782 households at the following census of 2011. At the most recent census of 2016, the population of the rural district was 2,435 in 884 households. The largest of its 33 villages was Shushud, with 460 people.

References 

Birjand County

Rural Districts of South Khorasan Province

Populated places in South Khorasan Province

Populated places in Birjand County